You're the Worst is an American comedy-drama television series created by Stephen Falk that premiered on July 17, 2014, on FX. It is centered on Jimmy (Chris Geere), a self-involved writer, and Gretchen (Aya Cash), a self-destructive Los Angeles public relations executive, as they attempt a relationship. For the second and successive seasons, the series moved to FXX. In November 2017, FX renewed the series for a fifth and final season which premiered on January 9, 2019.

Series overview

Episodes

Season 1 (2014)

Season 2 (2015)

Season 3 (2016)

Season 4 (2017)

Season 5 (2019)

Ratings

References

External links
 

Lists of American comedy-drama television series episodes
Lists of American romance television series episodes
Lists of American sitcom episodes